Skylan Brooks (born February 12, 1999) is an American actor, best known for playing Mister in The Inevitable Defeat of Mister & Pete.

Early life 
Brooks was born in Torrance, California.

Career 
In 2013, Brooks played the titular role of Mister in the drama film The Inevitable Defeat of Mister & Pete along with Ethan Dizon, Anthony Mackie and Jennifer Hudson, and the film was directed by George Tillman, Jr. The film was released on October 11, 2013 by Lionsgate Entertainment. Brooks was highly praised by media and film critics.

Brooks played the role of Ra-Ra in the Netflix musical series The Get Down. In 2018, He also played Charles "Chubs" Meriwether in The Darkest Minds.

Filmography

Film

Television

Awards and nominations

References

External links 
 

Living people
1999 births
American male child actors
American male film actors
American male television actors
21st-century American male actors
Male actors from Los Angeles
People from Los Angeles